Hugh Yancy (born October 16, 1949 in Sarasota, Florida) is an American former professional baseball player. He appeared in 7 games spread across 3 seasons in Major League Baseball for the Chicago White Sox between 1972 and 1976. He bats and throws right-handed.

The Chicago White Sox drafted Yancy in the 1968 Major League Baseball Draft. In 1972, he appeared in three games as a second baseman, getting one hit in nine at bats. In 1974, he appeared in one game as a pinch hitter, executing a sacrifice bunt in his lone plate appearance. Then, in 1976, he appeared in three more games as a third baseman, getting one hit in ten at-bats.

After the 1976 season, Yancy was traded to the Cincinnati Reds, but never again played in the major leagues. He played one season in the Reds organization, then played in the Cleveland Indians organization in 1978-79 before retiring.

References 

Major League Baseball infielders
Chicago White Sox players
Gulf Coast White Sox players
Duluth-Superior Dukes players
Appleton Foxes players
Asheville Tourists players
Knoxville Sox players
Iowa Oaks players
Denver Bears players
Syracuse Chiefs players
Toledo Mud Hens players
Indianapolis Indians players
Portland Beavers players
Tacoma Tugs players
Baseball players from Florida
1949 births
Living people
Sarasota High School alumni
Sportspeople from Sarasota, Florida
African-American baseball players